Reynaldo Villalobos II (born November 9, 1940) is an American cinematographer and director, noted for his dark and realistic cinematography.

Reynaldo Villalobos is the father of American singer-songwriter Gina Villalobos.

Select filmography

 1980: Urban Cowboy
 1980: 9 to 5
 1981: The Children Nobody Wanted
 1982: The Ballad of Gregorio Cortez
 1983: Risky Business
 1984: Blame It on Rio
 1984: Mike's Murder
 1984: Windy City
 1985: Deadly Intentions
 1986: Lucas
 1986: Desert Bloom
 1986: Band of the Hand
 1986: A Smoky Mountain Christmas
 1988: Punchline
 1989: Major League
 1990: Coupe de Ville
 1990: Sibling Rivalry
 1991: Conagher (director)
 1992: American Me
 1993: A Bronx Tale
 1993: Roosters
 1994: PCU
 1997: Loved
 1997: Hollywood Confidential (director)
 1997: Romy and Michele's High School Reunion
 1997: Telling Lies in America
 1997: An Alan Smithee Film: Burn Hollywood Burn
 1998: Return to Paradise
 2000: Love & Basketball
 2001: Not Another Teen Movie
 2002: Juwanna Mann
 2006: Sacrifice (Battlestar Galactica, 1 episode, director)
 2006: Bordertown
 2008: Breaking Bad (6 episodes)
 2009: Like Dandelion Dust
 2014: Big Stone Gap
 2019: Windows on the World

References

External links 
 

Living people
American cinematographers
American film directors
1940 births